Milan Toman (born November 30, 1979) is a Czech professional ice hockey defenceman. He played with HC Kladno in the Czech Extraliga during the 2010–11 Czech Extraliga season. He has played with BK Mladá Boleslav since 2012.

References

External links

1979 births
Living people
BK Mladá Boleslav players
Czech ice hockey defencemen
HC Sparta Praha players
HC Slovan Ústečtí Lvi players
HC Stadion Litoměřice players
Motor České Budějovice players
Orli Znojmo players
People from Litoměřice
Piráti Chomutov players
Rytíři Kladno players
Sportovní Klub Kadaň players
Sportspeople from the Ústí nad Labem Region